The piedtails are a small group of hummingbird in the genus Phlogophilus. It contains two species:
 Peruvian piedtail (Phlogophilus harterti)
 Ecuadorian piedtail (Phlogophilus hemileucurus)

References

Phlogophilus
Bird genera
 
Taxonomy articles created by Polbot